The 2000 Australian GT Production Car Championship was a CAMS sanctioned motor racing title open to GT Production Cars.
The championship, which was the fifth Australian GT Production Car Championship, was the first to be contested without the “exotic” cars such as Porsches and Ferraris which competed in a separate Australian Nations Cup Championship for the first time in the year 2000.

Calendar
The championship was contested over an eight-round series. 
 Round 1, Barbagallo Raceway, Western Australia, 19 March
 Round 2, Adelaide Parklands Circuit, South Australia, 8 April
 Round 3, Eastern Creek International Raceway, New South Wales, 30 April
 Round 4, Canberra Street Circuit, Australian Capital Territory, 10 June
 Round 5, Queensland Raceway, Ipswich, Queensland, 2 July
 Round 6, Oran Park, New South Wales, 30 July
 Round 7, Calder Park Raceway, Victoria 20 August
 Round 8, Sandown International Motor Raceway, Victoria, 8 October

The Adelaide Parklands round was staged over a single race and all other rounds utilised a two race format.

Results

Drivers – Outright results

Drivers – Class results

Manufacturers – Outright results

Manufacturers – Class results

References

Australian GT Production Car Championship
GT Production Car Championship
Procar Australia